Aliança do Tocantins is a municipality located in the Brazilian state of Tocantins. Its population was 5,346 (2020) and its area is 1,580 km².

References

Municipalities in Tocantins